Yoo Ah-in (born October 6, 1986) is a South Korean actor, creative director, and gallerist. He is best known for his leading roles in coming-of-age film Punch (2011), melodrama Secret Affair (2014), action blockbuster Veteran (2015), period drama The Throne (2015), historical television series Six Flying Dragons (2015-2016), psychological thriller mystery drama Burning (2018), zombie film #Alive (2020), indie crime drama film Voice of Silence (2020), and dark fantasy series Hellbound (2021).

Film

Television series

Web series

Television shows

Music video appearances

Video games

References

South Korean filmographies